Rokautskyia leuzingerae is a species of flowering plant in the family Bromeliaceae, endemic to Brazil (the state of Espírito Santo). It was first described by Elton Leme in 1999 as Cryptanthus leuzingerae.

References

leuzingerae
Flora of Brazil
Plants described in 1999